Robison House may refer to:

Sri Lanka 
 Robison House, a House system house at Thurstan College in Columbo

United States 

Boudreaux-Robison House, Tucson, Arizona, listed on the National Register of Historic Places (NRHP) in Pima County
Robison House (Sparks, Nevada), NRHP-listed in Washoe County
Robison Mansion, Canon City, Colorado, NRHP-listed in Fremont County